The Tata Tamo Racemo was a sports coupé developed by Tata Motors under sub-brand TaMo. It was unveiled at 87th Geneva Motor Show. This could be the first car launched under the sub-brand name TaMo. Racemo could have been offered in two variants – road-based Racemo and track-ready Racemo+. It was reported that a limited number of 250 Racemos were to be built. But due to cost cutting, the TaMo concept had been halted and the project will most probably not resume again.

Tamo Racemo 003 

Tamo Racemo 003 was the electric version of the sports coupe, Tamo Racemo, developed by Tata Motors.

References

External links
TaMo Racemo official site

Coupés
Sports cars
Cars introduced in 2017